Avirulence on Ve1 is a protein first described from the fungal plant-pathogen, Verticillium dahliae, and is encoded by the Ave1 gene.

The presence of Ave1 in an isolate of Verticillium dahliae conveys an avirulence phenotype when infecting a Tomato host that possesses the R-gene Ve1.

Orthologous genes
Orthologs of Ave1 have been identified in a number of plant pathogenic fungi.

References

Further reading 

 

Fungal plant pathogens and diseases
Fungal proteins